Padaung or Padaung Karen, also known as Kayan, is a Karen language of Burma, spoken by the Kayan people.

Distribution
Pekhon, southern Shan State
northwestern Kayah State
Thandaung township, Kayin State
Pyinmana township, Mandalay Region
Kayan Lahwi dialect: Lahwi and northwest Dimawso, Kayah State; southern Pekhon, southern Shan State
Kayan Kangan dialect: Dimawso area, northwestern Kayah State

Internal classification
The Kayan languages are spoken in Kayah State, southern Shan State, and northern Karen State. There are four branches according to Shintani (2016), namely:
Kangan ("lowland dwellers")
Kakhaung ("highland dwellers")
Lawi ("South")
Latha ("North")

Nangki (sometimes called Langki), documented in Shintani (2016), is one of the Kayan languages belonging to the Kakhaung subgroup. It is spoken only in one village.

Pekong Kayan is documented in Manson (2010).

Sonkan Kayan and Dosanbu Kayan are documented in Shintani (2018a, b). Shintani has also documented:by families or by villages as below:

Phulon Kayan
Lagu Kayan
Totan Kayan
Dokhoncon Kayan
Natwei Kayan
Pimon Kayan
Sonplao Kayan
Dolan Kayan
Thaoku Kayan
Diklon Kayan
Pulon Kayan
Kabla Kayan
Kathan Kayan
Kalondei  Kayan etc.....

Dimawso Kayan, a Kayan variety spoken in Wanbanbalo village, Dimawso township, Kayah State, Myanmar, is described in Lew (2018).

Ethnologue lists Padaung (Kayan) dialects as:
Standard Pekon (prestige dialect)
Kayan Lahwi
Kayan Kangan (Yeinbaw, Yinbaw)

References

Shintani, Tadahiko. 2020. A handbook of comparative Kayan languages. Linguistic survey of Tay cultural area (LSTCA). Tokyo: Research Institute for Languages and Cultures of Asia and Africa (ILCAA).
Aung, Wai Lin. 2013. A Descriptive Grammar of Kayah Monu. Master’s thesis, Payap University.
Ywar, Naw Hsa Eh. 2013. A Grammar of Kayan Lahta. Master’s thesis, Payap University.

Karenic languages